Dastjerd is a village in Dastjerd Rural District, Gugan District, Azarshahr County, East Azerbaijan Province, Iran. At the 2006 census, its population was 1,595, in 427 families.

References 

Populated places in Azarshahr County